Beyond the Pale may refer to:

Literature
 Beyond the Pale (book), a 1998 novel in the Last Rune series by Mark Anthony
 Beyond the Pale Publications, a company in Northern Ireland
 "Beyond the Pale", a short story by Rudyard Kipling, collected in the 1888 collection Plain Tales from the Hills
 Beyond the Pale, a 1997 novel by Elana Dykewomon

Music
 Beyond the Pale (band), a Canadian klezmer and folk music band
 Beyond the Pale (Brave Old World album), 1994
 Beyond the Pale (Fiona album), 1986
 Beyond the Pale (Jarv Is album), 2020
 Beyond the Pale, an album by The Dark Poets, 2008
 Beyond the Pale, an album by X-Fusion, 2004
 "Beyond the Pale", a song by Kerry Livgren/AD from the 1984 album Time Line
 "Beyond the Pale", a song by Big Audio Dynamite from the 1986 album No. 10, Upping St.
 "Beyond the Pale", a song by Pain of Salvation from the 2002 album Remedy Lane
 "Beyond the Pale", a song by Exodus from the 2010 album Exhibit B: The Human Condition
 "Beyond the Pale", a song by The Mission from the 1988 album Children
 "Beyond the Pale", a song by Mudvayne from the 2009 eponymous album
 "Beyond the Pale", a song by Machine Head from the 2018 album Catharsis

Other uses
 Beyond the Pale (1989 film), a British television film by William Trevor in the anthology series ScreenPlay
 Beyond the Pale (radio program), a radio program about Jewish culture and politics
 Beyond the Pale (film), a 1999 film directed by George Bazala
 Beyond the Pale (Jim Gaffigan album), a 2006 comedy album

See also
 Tales From Beyond the Pale, a horror podcast